Phu Ninh may refer to several populated places in Vietnam:

Phú Ninh District, a rural district of Quảng Nam Province
Phù Ninh District, a rural district of Phú Thọ Province
Phù Ninh, Haiphong, a commune of Thủy Nguyên District
Phù Ninh, Phú Thọ, a commune of Phù Ninh District